Koritharicha Naal is a 1982 Indian Malayalam film, directed by J. Sasikumar and produced by T. K. K. Nambiar. The film stars Soman, Adoor Bhasi, Balan K. Nair, Jalaja and Kanakadurga in the lead roles. The film has musical score by M. K. Arjunan.

Cast
Soman
Adoor Bhasi
Balan K. Nair
Jalaja
Jyothi
Kanakadurga
M. G. Soman
Shanavas

Soundtrack
The music was composed by M. K. Arjunan and the lyrics were written by Chirayinkeezhu Ramakrishnan Nair.

References

External links
 

1982 films
1980s Malayalam-language films